Nova Televisión is a Colombian local television channel based in Bogotá. Its broadcasting licence was granted by the National Television Commission on 15 September 2004. It is owned by Corporación Nova Comunicazioni, an Italian-Colombian non-profit company.

References

External links 
 Official website

Television networks in Colombia
Television channels and stations established in 2004
Spanish-language television stations
Mass media in Bogotá